Matthew T. Cooper (born March 8, 1934) is a retired lieutenant general in the United States Marine Corps who served as Deputy Chief of Staff for Manpower and Reserve Affairs. He was born in Lexington, North Carolina and graduated from the United States Naval Academy in 1958.

References

1934 births
Living people
United States Marine Corps generals